DevilDriver is the debut studio album by American heavy metal band DevilDriver, the new band of former Coal Chamber singer Dez Fafara. In comparison to the other albums by DevilDriver, it is musically simpler, and Fafara sings in a different style.

The album's cover art features the Cross of Confusion, the band's logo.

Music videos were produced for "Nothing's Wrong?" and "I Could Care Less," the singles released off of the album, and found extensive airplay on programs such as Headbangers Ball and Uranium.

The song "Devil's Son" was featured in the tenth episode of the sixth season of Scrubs. "Swinging the Dead" is featured on the Freddy vs. Jason soundtrack.

Track listing

Singles
"Nothing's Wrong?"
"I Could Care Less"
"Swinging the Dead"

Personnel
Dez Fafara - vocals
Evan Pitts - lead guitar
Jeff Kendrick - rhythm guitar
Jon Miller - bass
John Boecklin - drums

Additional musicians
Mike Doling - guitar on "Devil's Son"

References

2003 debut albums
DevilDriver albums
Roadrunner Records albums